Beattie is a city in Marshall County, Kansas, United States.  As of the 2020 census, the population of the city was 197.  The city has been called "The Milo Capital of the World" and hosts the annual "Beattie Milo Festival".

History
Beattie was laid out in 1870. It is named for Armstrong Beattie, eighth Mayor of St. Joseph, Missouri.

The first post office in Beattie was established in July 1871.

Geography
Beattie is located at  (39.861736, -96.419091).

Demographics

2010 census
As of the census of 2010, there were 200 people, 90 households, and 51 families residing in the city. The racial makeup of the city was 95.0% White, 1.0% African American, 1.5% Native American, 1.0% from other races, and 1.5% from two or more races. Hispanic or Latino of any race were 3.5% of the population.

There were 90 households, of which 18.9% had children under the age of 18 living with them, 50.0% were married couples living together, 3.3% had a female householder with no husband present, 3.3% had a male householder with no wife present, and 43.3% were non-families. 42.2% of all households were made up of individuals, and 21.1% had someone living alone who was 65 years of age or older. The average household size was 2.01 and the average family size was 2.73.

The median age in the city was 49.5 years. 14% of residents were under the age of 18; 8% were between the ages of 18 and 24; 21% were from 25 to 44; 41% were from 45 to 64; and 16% were 65 years of age or older. The gender makeup of the city was 50.0% male and 50.0% female.

2000 census
As of the census of 2000, there were 277 people, 107 households, and 63 families residing in the city. The racial makeup of the city was 95.67% White, 0.36% African American, 0.36% Pacific Islander, 2.89% from other races, and 0.72% from two or more races. Hispanic or Latino of any race were 3.97% of the population.

There were 107 households, out of which 32.7% had children under the age of 18 living with them, 52.3% were married couples living together, 2.8% had a female householder with no husband present, and 41.1% were non-families. 35.5% of all households were made up of individuals, and 19.6% had someone living alone who was 65 years of age or older. The average household size was 2.51 and the average family size was 3.25.

In the city, the population was spread out, with 26.4% under the age of 18, 7.2% from 18 to 24, 28.2% from 25 to 44, 21.7% from 45 to 64, and 16.6% who were 65 years of age or older. The median age was 39 years. For every 100 females, there were 99.3 males. For every 100 females age 18 and over, there were 92.5 males.

The median income for a household in the city was $29,583, and the median income for a family was $36,875. Males had a median income of $30,066 versus $14,722 for females. The per capita income for the city was $12,204. About 14.9% of families and 17.0% of the population were below the poverty line, including 10.9% of those under the age of eighteen and 11.1% of those 65 or over.

Education
The community is served by Marysville USD 364 public school district.

References

Further reading

External links 
 Beattie - Directory of Public Officials
 Beattie city map, KDOT

Cities in Kansas
Cities in Marshall County, Kansas